Sumit Kumar Jain (born 13 June 1984) is an Indian software engineer and Internet entrepreneur. He started online real-estate  portal Commonfloor.com for property seekers in 2007. Prior to that, he used to work with Oracle. As the co-founder and CEO, Sumit is responsible for driving the strategic direction for CommonFloor as well as delivering on company goals. On 7 January 2016, the classifieds advertising platform Quikr announced that they acquired CommonFloor. After 1 year of acquisition, Sumit moved out of Quikr. In July 2017, Sumit along with Co-Founder Ashwani Jain launched Opentalk, a social voice app aimed to help users become better at speaking English by talking with other English speakers. Sumit is now the Co-Founder & CEO of Graphy.com, a platform to help the creators grow their audience, monetize their skills, and host live cohort-based courses.

Early life
Born and brought up in Khatauli, a small town in Uttar Pradesh, India. Sumit's  father had a shop where he sold building products, in which he spent most of his time when  a child, and sometimes his father left the store under his care for days, telling him not to call him for any reason.

Career
Sumit graduated as a computer engineer from the Indian Institute of Technology Roorkee in 2006. After a short spell with Oracle Server Technologies, he decided to start his own business and in 2007 he started Commonfloor.com with Lalit Mangal and Vikas Malpani. He sold CommonFloor to Quikr in Jan 2016 and worked with Quikr for a year. He started Opentalk in 2017 along with Ashwani Jain. He Co-founded Graphy.com in 2020 along with Sushil Kumar, Shobhit Bakliwal, and Fiona Leong.

Awards and recognition
 Fortune 40 Under 40
 Dataquest’s list of the 25 Hot Indian Web 2.0 start-ups
 Business World Hottest Young Entrepreneurs
 Listed in Power Profiles in India for the year of 2015
 Younger Achiever of the Year 2015' by National Awards for Excellence in Real Estate & Infrastructure

References

External links
 
 Sumit Jain on Facebook
 

Living people
Businesspeople from Bangalore
Indian software engineers
Engineers from Karnataka
IIT Roorkee alumni
1984 births
People from Muzaffarnagar district